General elections were held in Montserrat on 11 November 1996. The result was a hung parliament, with no party holding more than two seats. Although the People's Progressive Alliance received the largest number of votes, Bertrand Osborne of the Movement for National Reconstruction became Chief Minister after forming a coalition government with the National Progressive Party (which had been the ruling party between 1991 and 1996) and an independent MP.

Campaign
A total of 26 candidates contested the elections. All three parties nominated seven candidates, with five independents also running.

Results

By constituency

References

1996
1996 elections in the Caribbean
1996 in Montserrat
1996 elections in British Overseas Territories
November 1996 events in North America